El Desafío (1995) is a Venezuelan telenovela created by Salvador Garmendia and Martín Hahn for RCTV as a free version of the Mexican telenovela Doménica Montero from Cuban Mexican writer Inés Rodena. This telenovela lasted 113 episodes and was distributed internationally by RCTV International.

Claudia Venturini and Henry Soto star as the main protagonists with Mimi Lazo, Roberto Moll and Lucy Mendoza as the main antagonists.

Synopsis

In a grand hacienda, near a coastal region surrounded by spectacular beaches, springs a story of love that is as willful and strong as its heroes... a story that begins with a challenge between two indomitable lovers and concludes with a love that defies the limits of greed, envy, and treachery. Fernanda San Vicente is a sweet and beautiful young woman who suffers a complete transformation in her personality upon discovering her lover's betrayal and her father's murder on the night of her wedding. As a result, Fernanda flees to the hacienda she inherited from her father; now impenetrable and filled with an immense resentment toward all men, she vows to rule over the hacienda and the town itself. She is accompanied by her ambitious cousin Federico (who had engineered several illegal business dealings using her family's resources and her envious cousin Marilinda, who had been having an affair with Fernanda's fiancée Mariano. Having arrived, they meet Aquiles Hurtado, the barbaric oversees of the hacienda in order to get what he wants. Still, Fernanda rules the area with an iron hand... until the moment she meets Arturo Gallardo, the only man capable of batling Fernanda for a stretch of land on the beach. Ultimately, Arturo and Fernanda fall victim to their own feelings, and the competition between them turns into a true story of love. But the love between Arturo and Fernanda represents a terrible threat to those who would take possession of Fernanda's land. Driven by greed, Marilinda, Federico, and Aquiles enlist the aid of Fernanda's mother Cristina, a woman who had abandoned her daughter years before and who had returned to the area after spending all of her money. Sergio, Cristina's young and ambitious lover, is included in their plans to destroy Arturo and Fernanda at all costs. But in the end, it is destiny that decides their fate and love that proves Defiant.

Cast
Claudia Venturini as Fernanda San Vicente
Henry Soto as Arturo Gallardo
Carlos Arreaza as Federico García San Vicente
Catherine Correia as Teresita
Mimi Lazo as Ana Luisa
Esperanza Magaz as Severa
Lucy Mendoza as Marilinda García San Vicente
Roberto Moll as Aquiles Hurtado
Amilcar Rivero as Juan Ponchao
Rafael Romero as Sergio Duarte
Elisa Stella as Cecilia

References

External links
El Desafio at the Internet Movie Database
Opening Credits

1994 telenovelas
RCTV telenovelas
Venezuelan telenovelas
1994 Venezuelan television series debuts
1994 Venezuelan television series endings
Spanish-language telenovelas
Television shows set in Venezuela